The 2011 Portland Timbers season was the debut season for the Portland Timbers in Major League Soccer (MLS), the top flight professional soccer league in the United States and Canada. As the fourth incarnation of a professional soccer club to bear the Portland Timbers name, the MLS version of the Timbers began the 25th season in club history with three games on the road due to ongoing renovations to Jeld-Wen Field.

The club's first game was played at Dick's Sporting Goods Park versus Colorado Rapids on March 19, which the Timbers lost 3–1. The first MLS match in Portland was on April 14 when the Timbers bested the Chicago Fire by a scoreline of 4–2 in front of a sold-out crowd of 18,627 at newly renovated Jeld-Wen Field.

Season review

March
The Timbers came into their first MLS game nursing injuries to several players including expected starters Darlington Nagbe, Sal Zizzo and Troy Perkins as well as Bright Dike and Eddie Johnson.

The defending champions Colorado Rapids took the field with the same 11 players which had started MLS Cup 2010 and dealt the Timbers an early blow with an 8th-minute goal by Jeff Larentowicz. The Rapids scored two more first half goals in rapid succession to put Portland down 3–0 at halftime. Timbers forward Kenny Cooper scored the first ever MLS goal for Portland from a free kick in the 80th minute but it was not enough as the Timbers lost their inaugural game 3–1. The Timbers Army — an independent supporters group for the Portland Timbers – sent over 400 members to Dick's Sporting Goods Park for the game, a record for away support in Colorado.

Prior to the March 26 game versus Toronto FC, it was announced that defender Mamadou Danso had been called up for Gambia and would miss the match. Portland would also be without Nagbe, Perkins, Dike and Johnson because of injuries while Zizzo returned after recovering from a separated shoulder.

Toronto opened the scoring in the 14th minute through Javier Martina. Backup goalkeeper Adin Brown suffered a strained hamstring in the first half and was replaced by Jake Gleeson at halftime. Gleeson made 3 saves during the game, including one which earned the young goalkeeper MLS Save of the Week honors, but Martina found the back of the net again in the 70th minute to put the game beyond reach as the Timbers lost 2–0. Midfielder Sal Zizzo came on as a second-half substitute for Portland but reinjured his shoulder and was expected to be out two more weeks.

Unlike previous years when second division Portland sides were often guaranteed a spot in the U.S. Open Cup, the Timbers would have to defeat three other MLS teams in a qualification tournament in order to join the competition. The Timbers began their campaign to qualify for the 2011 U.S. Open Cup on March 29 as the team played their first game in Portland versus Chivas USA. Due to ongoing renovations at Jeld-Wen Field, Portland hosted the game at Merlo Field on the campus of the University of Portland. Injuries to their starting and backup goalkeepers forced the Timbers to add Kevin Guppy to the squad from the league-wide MLS Goalkeeper Pool as an emergency backup to Gleeson.

A sell-out crowd of 5,061 were on hand as the MLS version of the Timbers made their debut in Portland. Chivas USA were reduced to 10 men after Andrew Boyens was shown a second yellow card late in the first half. It took nearly the entire second half for the Timbers to capitalize on the man advantage as substitute Jack Jewsbury finally gave Portland the lead with a long-range strike in the 84th minute. Captain for the night, Eric Brunner, sealed a first-ever competitive win for the Timbers with a headed goal two minutes later as Portland won 2–0 to advance to the semifinals of the qualification tournament versus the San Jose Earthquakes.

April
Hoping to build on their positive result in Portland, the Timbers started the league game against the New England Revolution with the same 11 players which were on the field at the conclusion of the U.S. Open Cup qualification win versus Chivas USA. Both Eddie Johnson and rookie Darlington Nagbe recovered from their injuries and were available on the bench. The Timbers again fell behind to an early goal but were able to equalize just before the end of the first half through captain Jack Jewsbury. Portland held on for the 1–1 draw to gain the club's first ever point in Major League Soccer. Nagbe made his Timbers debut in the 66th minute, coming on for Jeremy Hall.

On April 7, one week before the Timbers home opener at Jeld-Wen Field, starting center back David Horst suffered an ankle injury during practice and was expected to miss several weeks. The next day it was announced that the Timbers would host the U.S. Open Cup qualification semifinal match vs. San Jose Earthquakes at Jeld-Wen Field on May 3. San Jose originally won hosting rights for the game through a preseason coin toss but was unable to secure a venue in time.

Portland recorded another club first on April 13 when the Timbers signed their first ever Designated Player, Diego Chará. The 25-year-old Colombian midfielder, who was a childhood friend and recent teammate of Jorge Perlaza at Deportes Tolima, was expected to join the Timbers after acquiring his P-1 visa. It was later revealed, when the players union released salary figures for all MLS players, that Chará's salary was well below the level usually associated with Designated Players and his designation as such was due to the transfer fee paid by the Timbers to Tolima.

Chicago Fire were the Timbers opponents for the first ever MLS game in Portland on April 14. Fans lined up outside Jeld-Wen Field hours before kickoff in a steady downpour that would last throughout the night. Prior to kickoff, the Timbers Army sang the national anthem en masse while accompanied by fireworks and subsequently revealed a large tifo display celebrating the city of Portland.

A boisterous sell-out crowd of 18,627 watched as Jorge Perlaza scored his first goal for the Timbers in the 29th minute to give Portland their first lead of the season. Less than 10 minutes later, the Timbers were up 2–0 after a long-range goal from defender Rodney Wallace. The dream start to Portland's home opener continued just after halftime when Perlaza pounced on a spilled rebound by Fire goalkeeper Sean Johnson to give the Timbers a 3–0 lead. Chicago attempted to stage a comeback after a 65th minute own goal by Eric Brunner and an AT&T Goal of the Week nominee blast by Marco Pappa in the 80th minute brought the Fire to within a single goal of the Timbers. Portland put the game beyond reach after a goal mouth scramble in the 84th minute restored the Timbers two-goal lead thanks to an own goal by Chicago defender Dasan Robinson. Portland held on for the 4–2 win, the club's first in league play.

The Timbers were back in Jeld-Wen Field three days later as they hosted FC Dallas in front of a second consecutive sell-out crowd. Just as in the game versus Chicago, Portland jumped out to a 2–0 first half lead thanks to goals from Jewsbury and Kenny Cooper then extended the lead to 3–0 early in the second half when Kalif Alhassan dribbled past four Dallas defenders to find Wallace who steered the ball into the back of the net for his second goal in as many games. In a scene which was to be repeated throughout the season, the Timbers gave up two goals late in the game to put the victory in jeopardy. However, Portland held on for the 3–2 win to remain perfect at home in MLS play.

May

June

July

August

September

October

Background

November 2010 
The building of the MLS Timbers began in earnest upon the completion of the 2010 MLS season on November 21, 2010. The very next day the club acquired midfielder/defender Jeremy Hall from New York Red Bulls in exchange for a third-round pick in the January SuperDraft and also traded allocation money to Los Angeles Galaxy in exchange for use of an international roster spot in the 2011 and 2012 seasons.

Two days after that, on November 24, 2010, the league conducted the 2010 MLS Expansion Draft which allowed both the Timbers and expansion cousins Vancouver Whitecaps to choose ten players each from those unprotected by their existing clubs. Portland drafted some players to keep, some players to trade, and some players to wait on in the future. In the expansion draft, the Timbers selected and kept five players: defender Eric Brunner (from Columbus Crew), midfielder Adam Moffat (Columbus), defender David Horst (Real Salt Lake), midfielder Peter Lowry (Chicago Fire), and defender Jordan Graye (D.C. United).

The club selected and immediately traded three players: midfielder Dax McCarty (selected from FC Dallas, traded to D.C. United), defender Anthony Wallace (selected from and traded back to Colorado Rapids), and midfielder Arturo Alvarez (selected from San Jose Earthquakes, traded to Real Salt Lake). McCarty was traded for defender Rodney Wallace and a 4th round SuperDraft pick; Wallace was traded for allocation money; and Alvarez was traded for a 2nd round SuperDraft pick.

The Timbers used their other two expansion picks to select the rights of players leaving MLS: forward Robbie Findley and defender Jonathan Bornstein. Both players' contracts were to expire on December 31, 2010. Bornstein had already signed a contract with Mexican side Tigres while Findley had broadly announced his intention to seek a contract in Europe, which he later found with English club Nottingham Forest. Portland drafted these players to hold their rights should they return to MLS.

December 2010 
The club continued shaping its roster in December. On December 13, Portland traded defender Jordan Graye to Houston Dynamo in exchange for a 2014 4th round SuperDraft pick. Four days later, the Timbers traded goalkeeper Steve Cronin and allocation money to D.C. United in exchange for goalkeeper Troy Perkins and salary considerations.

January
At the January 13, 2011 SuperDraft, the club selected Generation adidas forward Darlington Nagbe in round one and defender Chris Taylor in round two. The club also made two trades on draft day. The first saw Portland acquire the No. 11 pick in the draft and use of an international roster spot for the 2011 season from Seattle Sounders FC in exchange for the No. 20 pick and allocation money. Portland then traded the newly acquired No. 11 pick to Houston Dynamo in exchange for allocation money. The club was more than happy with its draft day results. "We get the international slot for a year and ultimately, through the deals, we're banking some allocation money," said Portland general manager and technical director Gavin Wilkinson. "So, the way we walk out of it, at the end of that, we're lucky to get the player we absolutely loved [Darlington Nagbe, chosen 2nd overall by Portland] and an international spot, which is needed in the way that we're trying to build this squad. … We think it was a win-win."

The following week, Portland selected forward Spencer Thompson, midfielder Robby Lynch, forward Raymundo Reza, and defender Taylor Mueller in the 2011 Supplemental Draft. Of all the draft choices, only Nagbe was immediately added to the club's roster as he had already signed a contract with Major League Soccer. Taylor, Thompson, Lynch, Reza, and Mueller are not guaranteed contracts and must earn a spot on the club's final roster.

On January 17, the club entered the international transfer market and acquired forward Kenny Cooper from Bundesliga 2 side 1860 Munich for an undisclosed fee. Portland used its No. 2 position in the MLS Allocation Ranking to acquire the MLS rights to Cooper.

The Timbers announced the signings of goalkeeper Adin Brown and defender Steve Purdy — both members of the USL Portland Timbers — on January 26.

Preseason

California training camp 

The Timbers began training camp in Ventura, California with their first practice on February 2. During the first preseason game against Ventura County Fusion on February 4, first round draft pick Darlington Nagbe scored in the second half to earn Portland a 1–1 draw. Forward Bright Dike sustained an Achilles tendon injury during the game and was expected to miss 6 to 9 months.

Portland faced their first MLS opposition on February 8 in a training match versus Los Angeles Galaxy. Newly acquired Los Angeles midfielder Miguel Pedro López was shown a red card in the first half but the Galaxy were allowed to replace him due to the nature of the match. The Timbers again relied on a second half equalizing goal – this time by trialist Brian Umony — to earn their second consecutive 1–1 draw.

Arizona training camp 

Just prior to leaving for training camp at Grande Sports World in Casa Grande, Arizona the Timbers announced that they had acquired midfielder Sal Zizzo from Chivas USA in exchange for allocation money and had signed two players from the undefeated 2010 Portland Timbers U-23 squad, Freddie Braun and Jake Gleeson.

Portland faced off against the Houston Dynamo on February 19 in a match that was halted in the 80th minute due to poor conditions. New signings Zizzo and Kenny Cooper made their debuts in the 0–0 draw. Due to the inclement weather, a scrimmage versus the United States U-18 men's national team scheduled for later the same day was cancelled.

The second training match in Arizona took place on February 23 against NASL side Montreal Impact. The Timbers held on for a 1–0 win – their first of the preseason – thanks to a 7th minute headed goal from forward Eddie Johnson.

On February 25, Portland introduced five former players and coaches from previous Portland Timbers squads as Alumni Ambassadors. John Bain (player, NASL Portland Timbers; head coach, WSA/APSL Portland Timbers), Bernie Fagan (player, NASL Portland Timbers; head coach, WSA/APSL Portland Timbers), Lee Morrison (player, USL Portland Timbers), Mick Hoban (player, NASL Portland Timbers) and Jim Brazeau (goalkeeper coach, USL Portland Timbers) joined previously announced Community Ambassador Scot Thompson (player, USL Portland Timbers) in an official capacity to represent the Timbers at community events and speaking engagements.

In their final preseason game in Arizona, the Timbers came away with another 0–0 draw versus Sporting Kansas City. Future Portland captain Jack Jewsbury came on as a 63rd-minute substitute for Kansas City in the match.

Cascadia Summit 

On March 1, the Timbers sent allocation money to Sporting Kansas City in exchange for midfielder Jack Jewsbury just before leaving for Tukwila, Washington to attend the 2011 Cascadia Summit.  That same day it was announced that rookie Darlington Nagbe would have to undergo surgery for a sports hernia and would miss 2 to 4 weeks.

The first match of the Cascadia Summit saw the Timbers defeat hosts Seattle Sounders FC 2–0 off of goals by trialist Jorge Perlaza and Kenny Cooper. New signing Jack Jewsbury wore the captain's armband for Portland, though he had been with the team for only two days, and would later be named captain on a permanent basis.

The next day, Portland faced their other Cascadia rivals, Vancouver Whitecaps FC, and the Timbers made 11 changes to the side that faced Seattle. Midfielder Ryan Pore scored early in the first half but the Whitecaps equalized before halftime thanks to an own goal from defender David Horst. Portland's reserves held Vancouver scoreless in the second half to come away with a 1–1 draw.

Final preparations 

Portland officially signed trialist Jorge Perlaza on March 7 after clearing up a complicated contract situation with his previous club, Deportes Tolima. After donning the armband during the Cascadia Summit, midfielder Jack Jewsbury was named captain for the remainder of the season on March 11.

The Timbers played their final preseason game on March 12 versus fellow Western Conference side San Jose Earthquakes at Buck Shaw Stadium in Santa Clara, California. Portland defender Eric Brunner gave the Timbers the lead in the 52nd minute but the Earthquakes equalized from the penalty spot 17 minutes later. San Jose defender Chris Leitch was sent off late in the game but, due to it being a preseason training match, the Earthquakes were allowed to replace him. Portland held on for the 1–1 draw to finish their preseason undefeated.

On March 14, Portland announced that Oregon-based windows and doors manufacturer Jeld-Wen had purchased the naming rights for PGE Park and that the stadium would be known as Jeld-Wen Field effective immediately. While details of the deal were not announced it was speculated to be a multi-year, multimillion-dollar deal.

Although it had been widely reported in Uganda for several weeks, the Timbers officially announced the signing of forward Brian Umony on a year-long loan from South African side Tuks FC on March 16. Portland announced three more player additions the next day as former Portland Timbers (USL) midfielder Rodrigo López, SuperDraft pick Chris Taylor and Supplemental Draft pick Spencer Thompson were all signed to contracts.

Just one day before the Timbers inaugural MLS game versus defending champions Colorado Rapids, Portland General Manager / Technical director Gavin Wilkinson revealed that the team had given up their pursuit of former Arsenal defender Kerrea Gilbert due to his P-1 visa being denied. Gilbert was removed from the official roster later that day.

Regular season

Competitions

Major League Soccer

Western Conference standings

Overall standings

Results summary

Results by round

Reserve League

West Division standings

U.S. Open Cup

Qualifying bracket
 Home teams listed at top of bracket.

Play-in round

Qualification semifinals

Cascadia Cup 

The Cascadia Cup is a trophy that was created in 2004 by supporters of the Portland Timbers, Seattle Sounders FC and Vancouver Whitecaps FC. It is awarded to the club with the best record in league games versus the other participants. Since 2009, when Seattle joined Major League Soccer, the cup has been contested between Portland and Vancouver only. In 2011, when the Timbers and the Whitecaps join the Sounders in MLS, all three Cascadia rivals will again vie for the cup.

Club

Coaching staff

Top scorers 
Players with 1 goal or more included only.

Disciplinary record 
Players with 1 card or more included only.

Goalkeeper stats 
All goalkeepers included.

Player movement

Transfers in

Loans in

Transfers out

Loans out

Unsigned draft picks

Allocation ranking
Portland is in the No. 14 position in the MLS Allocation Ranking. The allocation ranking is the mechanism used to determine which MLS club has first priority to acquire a U.S. National Team player who signs with MLS after playing abroad, or a former MLS player who returns to the league after having gone to a club abroad for a transfer fee. Portland started 2011 ranked No. 2 on the allocation list and used its ranking to acquire Kenny Cooper. A ranking can be traded, provided that part of the compensation received in return is another club's ranking.

International roster spots
Portland has 11 international roster spots. Each club in Major League Soccer is allocated 8 international roster spots, which can be traded. Portland acquired its first additional spot from Los Angeles Galaxy on November 22, 2010 for use in the 2011 and 2012 seasons. On January 14, 2011 the club acquired a second additional spot from Seattle Sounders FC for use in the 2011 season only. Portland acquired a third additional spot from Houston Dynamo on July 21, 2011 for use during the remainder of the 2011 season only. There is no limit on the number of international slots on each club's roster. The remaining roster slots must belong to domestic players. For clubs based in the United States, a domestic player is either a U.S. citizen, a permanent resident (green card holder) or the holder of other special status (e.g., refugee or asylum status).

Future draft pick trades
Future picks acquired: 2014 SuperDraft Round 4 pick acquired from Houston Dynamo.
Future picks traded: None.

MLS rights to other players
Portland has the MLS rights to Jonathan Bornstein and Robbie Findley. Both players declined contract offers by the league and signed overseas with no transfer fee received. Portland acquired rights to both players by drafting them in the 2010 MLS Expansion Draft.

Notes 
A.  Johnson signed for Portland Timbers (USL) before the 2010 transfer deadline and was loaned back to Austin for the remainder of the 2010 season.

References 

2011
American soccer clubs 2011 season
2011 Major League Soccer season
2011 in Portland, Oregon
Port